Sensible Soccer, often called Sensi, is an association football video game series which was highly popular in the early 1990s and which still retains a cult following. It was developed by Sensible Software and first released for Amiga and Atari ST computers in 1992 as well as for the PC. The series was created by Jon Hare and Chris Yates, as a successor to their previous football game MicroProse Soccer (1988), which in turn was inspired by the arcade video game Tehkan World Cup (1985).

It featured a zoomed-out bird's-eye view (the majority of games until then such as Kick Off and Match Day used a closer top-down or side view), editable national, club and custom teams and gameplay utilising a simple and user-friendly control scheme. One of the defining gameplay elements was the "aftertouch" feature, which enabled effective but unrealistic swerves. The game topped charts such as Amiga Power'''s "All Time Top 100". The graphic style of the game was used in other Sensible Software games, such as Mega-Lo-Mania, Cannon Fodder and Sensible Golf.

A "spiritual successor" to Sensible Soccer, Sociable Soccer, was announced by Jon Hare in November 2015, and early versions for PC, mobile and virtual reality were shown at nine different public venues across Europe, including Gamescom in Cologne and the London Science Museum in 2016, with development continuing despite an initially unsuccessful crowdfunding campaign on Kickstarter. Sociable Soccer was released on Steam Early Access on 12 October 2017, with PlayStation 4, Xbox One, iOS and Android versions to follow.

 History 

 Origins 
The basis for Sensible Soccer was MicroProse Soccer, released for home computers in 1988. It was designed by Jon Hare and programmed by Chris Yates, who adapted the gameplay format of arcade video game Tehkan World Cup (1985) while adding their own elements to create MicroProse Soccer. Hare and Yates went on to use MicroProse Soccer as the basis for Sensible Soccer in 1992, making further improvements to the gameplay.Sensible World of Soccer, commonly referred to as SWOS, was released in 1994. The game was almost published by Virgin Games, but they insisted on it being called Virgin Soccer. It became a first in video games when it attempted to encompass the entire professional footballing world into one game. Featuring many divisions in many countries around the globe, it featured a twenty season career mode which allowed players to manage and play as thousands of different clubs from across the globe, many of which were very obscure.

Next generation
The series would make a return in the summer of 2006, with a full 3D title released on PC, PlayStation 2 and Xbox. Codemasters, the holders of the licence, released the game across all PAL territories, with the design capabilities overseen by Jon Hare, the original designer of the game. Sensible Soccer 2006 was released on 9 June 2006.

Xbox Live Arcade
In 2006, Codemasters announced a new version of Sensible World of Soccer, developed by Kuju Sheffield, for the Xbox 360 to be released in summer 2007 on Xbox Live Arcade. It features both the classic "retro" visuals of the original SWOS, as well as new improved high definition graphics, and retains the exact gameplay of the 96/97 version of Sensible World of Soccer for the Amiga, along with the music from Sensible Soccer 2006. Due to problems with the game's network performance, the release was delayed in order for "significant proportions" of the network code to be rewritten. After missing several previous release dates, the game appeared on Xbox Live Arcade on 19 December 2007 but was quickly pulled. A statement from Microsoft confirmed that an incorrect version of the game had been made available, in which online play was not possible. The fixed version of the game was released two days later on 21 December. The Windows version was never released.

 Development 

Reflecting Sensible Software's devil-may-care approach to game design, the developers decided to make Sensible Soccer after playing around with sprites from Mega-Lo-Mania and deciding to use them in a football game.

Games in the series

Coverdisk games
At Christmas 1993, a free Sensible Software minigame was included on an Amiga Format cover disk. Called Cannon Soccer, it was essentially two bonus levels of Cannon Fodder (one of Sensible Software's other titles) in which the soldiers fought hordes of Sensible Soccer players in a snowy landscape.
On the Amiga Power Coverdisk 21 one of the demos was Sensible Soccer: England vs Germany, also known as Sensible Soccer Meets Bulldog Blighty. This featured a mode of play that involved replacing players with soldiers from Cannon Fodder, and the ball with a hand grenade. The grenade would randomly begin to flash eventually exploding, killing any nearby players.Sensible World of Moon Soccer a free covermount disk included with an issue of Amiga Action magazine in the UK. Play as Moon United, featured low gravity, a cratered pitch and hordes of alien players to trade.
The developers released a humorous spin-off called unSensible Soccer which consisted of apples vs. oranges instead of men. It was released as a free covermount disk with Amiga Action in March 1993.

ReceptionComputer Gaming World in June 1994 stated that "in the debate over the best football action/tactical game, there is no doubt that Sensible is in everyone's top three, no matter what format ... The game is fast and responsive ... a class act". The magazine added that the "Gameboy version is one of the best games" on the handheld.Sensible Soccers first release sold roughly 200,000 copies, according to company founder Jon Hare. He estimated that the series overall had sold 2 million copies by 2002.

Awards
From the time of its release, Mega placed the game at #1 in their Top 50 Mega Drive Games of All Time. The Mega CD version of the game was #2 in their Top 10 Mega CD Games of All Time in the same issue.Sensible World of Soccer 1995/96 received review scores of 96% from both Amiga Power and Amiga Format, the joint highest mark given for any game by either magazine.Amiga Format top scoring reviews at Amiga Magazine Rack In 2017, Gamesradar ranked the game 50th on their "Best Sega Genesis/Mega Drive games of all time" In 1996, Gamesmaster rated the Mega Drive version 7th in their "The Gamesmaster Mega Drive Top 10". In 1995, Total! listed Sensible Soccer 7 on their "Top 100 SNES Games". They praised the gameplay writing: "[Sensible Soccer] has the speed and fluidity to perfectly replicate all the speed, excitement and strategic complexity of the real Game."

In March 2007, The New York Times reported that Sensible World of Soccer (1994) was named to a list of the ten most important video games of all time by Stanford Professor Henry Lowood and the four members of his committee – the game designers Warren Spector and Steve Meretzky; Matteo Bittanti, an academic researcher; and Christopher Grant, a game journalist. This list was also announced at the 2007 Game Developers Conference.Sensible World of Soccer (1994) received recognition as one of the Ten Most Important Video Games of All Time, the so-called game canon, by the History of Science and Technology Collections at Stanford University.

See alsoMicroProse Soccer''

References

External links

 The Making of Sensible Soccer: Jon Hare and the Sensible team on the creation of their football opus

1992 video games
Acorn Archimedes games
Amiga games
Association football video games
Atari Jaguar games
Atari ST games
Amiga CD32 games
DOS games
Golden Joystick Award winners
Sega CD games
Sega Genesis games
Sensible Software
Super Nintendo Entertainment System games
Video games developed in the United Kingdom
Video game franchises introduced in 1992